Miyakea zhengi is a moth in the family Crambidae. It was described by W. Li and H. Li in 2007. It is found in (China (Tibet)) West Taiwan.

The length of the forewings is 16.5–18 mm. The ground colour of the forewings is greyish white, mixed with black scales. There is a yellow stripe in the basal area near the costa. The hindwings are white, with a darker apex.

Etymology
The species is named in honor of Professor Zheng Zhe-Min, a Chinese entomologist.

References

Crambini
Moths described in 2007
Moths of Asia